Josiah McElheny (1966, Boston) is an artist and sculptor, primarily known for his work with glass blowing and assemblages of glass and mirrored glassed objects (see Glass art).  He is a 2006 recipient of the MacArthur Fellows Program.  He lives and works in New York City.

Early life and education
McElheny grew up in Brookline, Massachusetts. McElheny went on to receive his BFA from the Rhode Island School of Design in 1988.  As part of that program, he trained under master glassblower Ronald Wilkins. After graduating, he was an apprentice to master glassblowers Jan-Erik Ritzman, Sven-Ake Caarlson and Lino Tagliapietra.

Career
In earlier works McElheny played with notions of history and fiction.  Examples of this are works that recreate Renaissance glass objects pictured in Renaissance paintings and modern (but lost) glass objects from documentary photographs (such as works by Adolf Loos).  He draws from a range of disciplines like architecture, physics, and literature, among others, and he works in a variety of media.

McElheny has mentioned the influence of the writings of Jorge Luis Borges in his work. His work has also been influenced by the work of the American abstract artist Donald Judd.

McElheny has also expressed interest in glassblowing as part of an oral tradition handed down generation to generation. He has used the infinity mirror visual effect in his explorations of apparently infinite space. His work also sometimes deals with issues of museological displays.

One of the artist's ongoing projects is "An End to Modernity" (2005), commissioned by the Wexner Center for the Arts at Ohio State University. The piece is a twelve-foot-wide by ten-foot-high chandelier of chrome and transparent glass modeled on the 1960s Lobmeyr design for the chandeliers found in Lincoln Center, and evoking as well the Big Bang theory. "The End of the Dark Ages," again inspired by the Metropolitan Opera House chandeliers and informed by logarithmic equations devised by the cosmologist David H. Weinberg was shown in New York City in 2008. Later that year, the series culminated in a massive installation titled "Island Universe" at White Cube in London and in Madrid. In 2019 the installation was exhibited at Stanford University's Cantor Center for the Arts.

Exhibitions

Solo exhibitions
 1990 – Jägarens Glasmuseet (The Hunter's Glass Museum), Arnescruv, Sweden,
 1993 – originals, fakes, reproductions, William Traver Gallery, Seattle
 1994 – Authentic History, Robert Lehman Gallery, Brooklyn, New York
 1995 – Stephen Friedman Gallery, London
 1995 – Installation with Ancient Roman Glass, Ancient Mediterranean and Egypt Gallery, Seattle Art Museum, Seattle,
 1995 – Donald Young Gallery, Seattle
 1996 – Barbara Kraków Gallery, Boston
 1997 -Non-Decorative Beautiful Objects, AC Project Room, New York
 1997 – Three Alter Egos, Donald Young Gallery, Seattle
 1999 – The Henry Art Gallery, University of Washington, Seattle
 1999 – The Isabella Stewart Gardner Museum, Boston
 2000 – Christian Dior, Jorges Luis Borges, Adolf Loos, Donald Young Gallery, Chicago and Brent Sikkema, New York
 2001 – Metal Party, Public Art Fund, New York
 2001 – Metal Party, Yerba Buena Center for the Arts, San Francisco
 2001 – Johnson County Community College, Overland Park, Kansas
 2002 – Centro Galego de Arte Contemporánea, Santiago de Compostela, Spain
 2003 – Theories About Reflection, Brent Sikkema Gallery, New York
 2003 – Antipodes: Josiah McElheny, White Cube, London
 2004 – Total Reflective Abstraction,  Donald Young Gallery, Chicago
 2005 – An End to Modernity, Wexner Center for the Arts at Ohio State University, Columbus, Ohio
 2006 – Modernity 1929–1965, Andrea Rosen Gallery, New York
 2006 – Cosmology, Design, and Landscape, Part I, Donald Young Gallery, Chicago
 2007 – Cosmology, Design, and Landscape, Part II, Donald Young Gallery, Chicago
 2007 – Projects 84: The Alpine Cathedral and the City-Crown, The Museum of Modern Art, New York
 2007 – The 1st at Moderna: The Alpine Cathedral and the City-Crown, Moderna Museet, Stockholm
 2008 – The Last Scattering Surface, Henry Art Gallery, University of Washington, Seattle and Rochester Art Center, Rochester, Minnesota
 2008 – Das Lichtklub von Batavia/The Light Club of Batavia, Institut im Glaspavillon, Berlin
 2008 – The Light Club of Batavia, Donald Young Gallery, Chicago
 2008 – The End of the Dark Ages, Andrea Rosen Gallery, New York
 2008 – Island Universe, White Cube, London
 2009 – A Space for an Island Universe, Museo Nacional Centro de Arte Reina Sofia, Madrid
 2009 – Proposal for a Chromatic Modernism, Andrea Rosen Gallery, New York
 2012 – Some Pictures of the Infinite, Institute of Contemporary Art, Boston
 2016 – The Ornament Museum, Museum of Applied Arts, Vienna
 2017 – The Crystal Land, White Cube, London
 2017 – Prismatic Park, Madison Square Park Conservancy, New York
 2018 – Island Universe, Moody Center for the Arts, Houston
 2018 – Cosmic Love, Corbett vs. Dempsey, Chicago
 2019 – Island Universe, Cantor Arts Center, Stanford
 2019 – Observations at Night, James Cohan Gallery, New York
 2021 – Libraries, James Cohan Gallery, New York

Awards
 1993 – Betty Bowen Special Recognition Award, Seattle Art Museum, Seattle, Washington
 1995 – Award Winner, 1995 Biennial Competition of The Louis Comfort Tiffany Foundation, New York, New York
 1998 – Bagley Wright Fund Award, Seattle, Washington
 2000 – The 15th Rakow Commission, Corning Museum of Glass, Corning, New York
 2005 – Artist-in-Residence Award, Wexner Center for the Arts, Columbus, Ohio
 2006 – MacArthur Fellows Program

Permanent collections
Albright-Knox Art Gallery, Buffalo 
Carnegie Museum of Art, Pittsburgh 
Center for Curatorial Studies, Bard College, Annandale-on-Hudson 
Centro Galego de Arte Contemporanea, Santiago di Compostela 
Chrysler Museum of Art, Norfolk 
Columbus Museum of Art, Columbus 
Corning Museum of Glass, Corning 
Dallas Museum of Art, Dallas 
Detroit Institute of Arts, Detroit 
Indianapolis Museum of Art, Indianapolis 
Institute of Contemporary Art, Boston
Los Angeles County Museum of Art, Los Angeles 
Memorial Art Gallery, Rochester 
Milwaukee Art Museum, Milwaukee 
Moderna Museet, Stockholm 
Munson-Williams-Proctor Arts Institute, Utica 
Museo Nacional Centro de Arte Reina Sofía, Madrid 
Museum of Fine Arts, Boston
Museum of Modern Art, New York
Phoenix Art Museum, Phoenix 
Rhode Island School of Design Museum, Providence 
Santa Barbara Museum of Art, Santa Barbara 
Seattle Art Museum, Seattle 
Tate Modern, London 
Whitney Museum of American Art, New York

Books
 Josiah McElheny: A Prism. Skira Rizzoli International, 2010. .
 The Light Club: On Paul Scheerbart's 'The Light Club of Batavia'. University of Chicago Press, 2010. .

References

American sculptors
Minimalist artists
1966 births
Living people
MacArthur Fellows
American glass artists
Rhode Island School of Design alumni
Recipients of the Rakow Commission
People from Brookline, Massachusetts